Aslı Canan Sabırlı (born 13 September 1991) is a Turkish women's footballer, who serves as a football manager, and played as a defender. She was a member of the Turkey girls' national under-17 and under-19  teams.

Early life 
Aslı Canan Sabırlı was born in Seyhan district of Adana Province, southern Turkey on 13 September 1991. She was educated at Aksaray University.

Club career 
Sabırlı obtained her license from Adana İdmanyurduspor in her hometown on 25 January 2015. She started to play in the team in the 2008–09 Turkish Women's Second Football League, and enjoyed her team's promotion to the First League at the end of the season. In the 2011–12 First League season, she transferred to the İzmir-based Konak Belediyespor. Her team became champion in the 2012–13 First League season. The next season, she played for Kayseri Gençlik Birliği in the Second League. In the 2014–15 season, Sabırlı joined the Third League-club Yahya Mazlum Halk Eğitim Merkezi Spor in Osmaniye. She scored 42 goals in 15 league games. She netted five goals of a match with 13–0 win, made a hat-trick in a match with 8–0 win, ten goals in a match with 18–0 win, eight goals in a match with 10–0 win, a hat-trick in a match with 12–0 win, and nine goals of a match with 22–0 win.  In the next season, she played in the Second League for Osmaniye Demirspor. She left the team after the first half of the 2016–17 season, and returned to her former club Adana İdmanyurduspor, which had troubles to remain in the First League. Despite efforts, Adana İdmanyurduspor was relegated to the Second League. In the second half of the 2016–17 season, she joined the Gaziantep-based club ALG Spor in the Second League, which were recently promoted from the Third League. She served as captain of her team. At the end of the season, she enjoyed her team's promotion to the First League. The team became even league leader shortly before the end of the season. At the end of the 2018–19 season, at which she remained on the substitute bench, her team became runner-up losing the champion title in the play-off match.

International career 
Sabırlı was admitted to the Turkey women's U-19 team debuting in a friendly match against North Macedonia on 22 January 2006, before she became a member of the national girls' U-17 team. With the girls' U-17 team, she took part in two games of the 2008 UEFA Women's Under-17 Championship – Group 6, and scored one goal against Moldova girls' U-17 team. She capped in seven matches in total for the U-17 team.

She played at the 2007 UEFA Women's Under-19 Championship First qualifying round, 2008 UEFA Women's Under-19 Championship First qualifying round, 2009 UEFA Women's Under-19 Championship – Group 2, 2009 Kuban Spring Tournament, and 2010 UEFA Women's U-19 Championship First qualifying round – Group 7 matches. She capped 24 times in total.

In 2007, it was reported that Sabırlı was selected to represent Turkey to play at the Coca-Cola World Women's Football Tournament held in Brazil on 29 July 2007.

Club career statistics 
.

Futsal career 
Sabırlı played also futsal during her university years at Aksaray University.

Managerial career 
Sabırlı was appointed technical director of ALG Spor's women's team in the 2018–19 Women's First League season, in addition to her squad membership.

By end of 2021, she was tasked with the traner position of Gaziantepgücü Spor youth team. In April 2022, women's club of Adana İdman Yurdu appointed her as technical director and later as trainer in the 2022–23 Super League season.

Honours 
 Turkish Women's First League
 Konak belediyespor
Winners (1): 2012–13

 ALG Spor
Runners-up (1): 2018–19

 Turkish Women's Second League
 Adana İdmanyurduspor
 Winners (1): 2008–09

 ALG Spor
Winners (1): 2017–18

References 

Living people
1991 births
People from Seyhan
Sportspeople from Adana
Aksaray University alumni
Turkish women's footballers
Women's association football defenders
Turkish women's futsal players
Adana İdmanyurduspor players
Konak Belediyespor players
ALG Spor players
Turkish women's football managers
Turkish female association football managers
21st-century Turkish women